After the Fifth General Elections held  in 1971 a new Ministry with M. Karunanidhi as Chief Minister was  formed on 15 March 1971.

Cabinet ministers

References 

 
Dravida Munnetra Kazhagam
Tamil Nadu ministries
1970s in Tamil Nadu
1980s in Tamil Nadu
1971 establishments in Tamil Nadu
Cabinets established in 1971